Ulocladium is a genus of fungi.  Species of this genus contain both plant pathogens and food spoilage agents.  Other species contain enzymes that are biological control agents. 
Some members of the genus can invade homes and are a sign of moisture because the mold requires water to thrive.  They can cause plant diseases or hay fever and more serious infections in immuno-suppressed individuals.

Species of Ulocladium resemble those of genus Alternaria with which they were once included. Several DNA-based phylogenetic studies place Ulocladium convincingly within Alternaria, suggesting that the latter is the correct classification for these species. However, Ulocladium, unlike Alternaria, do not produce alternariols, tenuazonic acid, altersolanols, or macrosporin.

The species Ulocladium oudemansii is utilised as a biocontrol agent against Botrytis cinerea. The New Zealand company Botryzen (2010) Ltd uses it to control Botrytis bunch rot in the NZ vineyard industry, Sclerotinia and Psa in the NZ kiwfruit industry.

Conidia 
Conidia are black, rough, with pointed base when young, with both transverse and longitudinal septae, single or in a short chain (only in U. chartarum). Conidiophores are pale brown, erect, multicelled, and develop conidia in a sympodial mode. The two common species of indoor Ulocladium are U. botrytis and U. chartarum. This genus is closely related to Alternaria and Stemphyllium. Ulocladium conidia are characteristic and can be identified by properly trained laboratory analysts, although spores of Alternaria and Pithomyces may be confused with Ulocladium.

Species (approximately 20) 
 Ulocladium alternariae (Cooke) Simmons, fungal agent of pistachio 
 Ulocladium atrum, biocontrol of Botrytis cinerea
 Ulocladium botrytis Preuss, claimed not a pathogen, but found to cause onychomycosis
 Ulocladium chartarum (G Preuss) EG Simmons, disease in immuno-suppressed patients
 Ulocladium chlamydosporum 
 Ulocladium consortiale, plant pathogen of caraway 
 Ulocladium cucurbitae (Letendre & Roum.) EG Simmons, leaf spot pathogen of cucumber 
 Ulocladium dauci EG Simmons
 Ulocladium lanuginosum(Harz) EG Simmons
 Ulocladium litoreum Pivkin & Zvereva
 Ulocladium manihoticola JM Yen
 Ulocladium manihoticolum JM Yen
 Ulocladium microspora Moub & Abdel-Hafez
 Ulocladium multiforme EG Simmons
 Ulocladium oblongo-ovoideum XG Zhang & TY Zhang
 Ulocladium ovoideum EG Simmons
 Ulocladium oudemansii EG Simmons, biocontrol of Botrytis cinerea
 Ulocladium populi E.G. Simmons, G. Newcombe & A. Shipunov
 Ulocladium septosporum (Preuss) EG Simmons
 Ulocladium tuberculatum EG Simmons

References 

 Ulocladium species
  Ulocladium pathogenicity 
 Ulocladium species
 www.botryzen.co.nz] Botryzen (2010) Ltd
 

 
Pleosporaceae